Aakash Choudhary (born 11 September 1994) is an Indian cricketer. He made his first-class debut for Jammu & Kashmir in the 2018–19 Ranji Trophy on 6 December 2018.

References

External links
 

1994 births
Living people
Indian cricketers
Place of birth missing (living people)
Jammu and Kashmir cricketers